Smilax havanensis  is a plant species native to Cuba, the Cayman Islands, Bahamas, Turks & Caicos, and southern Florida.

Smilax havanensis is a perennial vine armed with prickles. Flowers are small and green, berries dark purple with a waxy coating. Aprostocetus smilax, an Eulophid wasp, induces galls on this species.

References

External links
Leon Levy Native Plant Preserve, Bahamas National Trust, Eleuthera, Bahamas

Smilacaceae
Flora of the Caribbean
Flora of Florida
Plants described in 1760
Taxa named by Nikolaus Joseph von Jacquin
Flora without expected TNC conservation status